Binkos Point (‘Nos Binkos’ \'nos 'bin-kos\) is the point on the northeast side of the entrance to Latinka Cove on the northwest coast of Pefaur (Ventimiglia) Peninsula, Danco Coast on the Antarctic Peninsula.

The point is named after the settlement of Binkos in Southeastern Bulgaria.

Location
British mapping in 1978.

Maps
 British Antarctic Territory.  Scale 1:200000 topographic map.  DOS 610 Series, Sheet W 64 60.  Directorate of Overseas Surveys, UK, 1978.
 Antarctic Digital Database (ADD). Scale 1:250000 topographic map of Antarctica. Scientific Committee on Antarctic Research (SCAR). Since 1993, regularly upgraded and updated.

References
 Binkos Point. SCAR Composite Antarctic Gazetteer.
 Bulgarian Antarctic Gazetteer. Antarctic Place-names Commission. (details in Bulgarian, basic data in English)

External links
 Binkos Point. Copernix satellite image

Bulgaria and the Antarctic
Headlands of Graham Land
Danco Coast